The Easter mona is a Spanish kind of cake that is usually in all country, especially in eaten on Easter Sunday or Easter Monday in the Spanish regions of Catalonia, Valencia and Murcia. In other Spanish regions, these easter cakes are common with variations in the recipe and name.

Origins 

According to the writing of Joan Amades, mentions of the mona date back to the 15th century, though in the Joan Lacavalleria's 1696 dictionary, Gazophylacium Catalano-Latinum, mona still has a purely zoological definition (meaning female monkey). The 1783 edition of the dictionary of the Royal Spanish Academy has the following definition: "Catalonia, Valencia and Murcia. Cake baked with eggs in their shell at Easter, known in other parts of the Iberian Peninsula as Hornazo".

There are several hypotheses about the origin of the term:

 Muna: in ancient Arabic منى, a land tax in the form of an offering of cakes, boiled eggs or other agricultural products, literally meaning "gift" or "provision of the mouth".
 Munichia: celebration dedicated to Artemis in ancient Greece.
The tradition is often traced back to feasts that Roman shepherds celebrated with cakes or the Beltane, a Celtic festival that was celebrated in the month of May and where pastries with eggs were consumed.

Production and varieties 
Nowadays, the mona comes in all shapes and sizes, when previously they were generally round, like a rosca. Initially, the mona was a cake made with sugar or other sweeteners, and contained hard boiled eggs. However, in most parts of Catalonia over time the eggs were replaced by chocolate, and it eventually became the focus of the mona. In Valencia and Murcia, on the other hand, the recipe has not changed and still has the original form of a pastry with the hard-boiled egg on it.

Currently in Valencia, the Easter mona can be found with a hard-boiled egg on top or with an egg-white caramel, which is cooked along with the mona. In Valencia there are areas where the mona is typical all year, without the hard-boiled egg on it, but it often has different names such as tonya, panou, pa socarrat, and coca bova, among other alternatives.

Tradition 

In almost all Catalonia and Valencia, it is customary for godparents to give the mona to their godchild on Easter Sunday. On Easter Monday, families or groups of friends gather together and go somewhere, especially the countryside, to eat the mona. Traditionally, the age of the children was reflected in the number of eggs in the mona, until they were 12 years old. Currently, it is common for godparents to give the mona to their godchildren throughout their lives.

The Easter mona tradition is tied to that of bakers, who make works of art with pastry and chocolate, and since the mid-nineteenth century, mones have lost their initial simplicity, making their presentation more complex, for they must be elaborated with caramelized sugar, sugar almonds, jams, crunchy toppings, or silver anise, before being decorated with painted Easter eggs or figures made from porcelain, wood, cardboard or fabric.

References 

Easter cakes
Spanish traditions